The 2011 PTT Thailand Open was a tennis tournament played on indoor hard courts. It was the ninth edition of the Thailand Open, and was part of the ATP World Tour 250 Series of the 2011 ATP World Tour. It took place at the Impact Arena in Bangkok, Thailand, from September 26 through October 2, 2011.

Entrants

Seeds

 Seeds are based on the rankings of September 19, 2011.

Other entrants
The following players received wildcards into the singles main draw:
  Dominic Thiem
  Danai Udomchoke
  Kittipong Wachiramanowong

The following players received entry from the qualifying draw:
  Simone Bolelli
  Marco Chiudinelli
  Greg Jones
  Go Soeda

Finals

Singles

 Andy Murray defeated  Donald Young, 6–2, 6–0
 It was Murray's third title of the year and 19th of his career.

Doubles

 Oliver Marach /  Aisam-ul-Haq Qureshi defeated  Michael Kohlmann /  Alexander Waske, 7–6(7–4), 7–6(7–5)

External links
Official website

 
 ATP World Tour
Tennis, ATP World Tour, PTT Thailand Open
Tennis, ATP World Tour, PTT Thailand Open

Tennis, ATP World Tour, PTT Thailand Open
Tennis, ATP World Tour, PTT Thailand Open